Totally Country Vol. 5 is an album in the Totally Hits series, which features 17 country singles from 2004 to 2006.

Track listing
"Kerosene" – Miranda Lambert (3:07)
"Homewrecker" – Gretchen Wilson (3:27)
"How Am I Doin'" – Dierks Bentley (3:49)
"Comin' to Your City" – Big & Rich (3:30)
"Suds in the Bucket" – Sara Evans (3:48)
"Help Somebody" – Van Zant (4:14)
"I Play Chicken with the Train" – Cowboy Troy with Big & Rich (3:18)
"You Do Your Thing" – Montgomery Gentry (3:43)
"Redneck Yacht Club" – Craig Morgan (3:49)
"XXL" – Keith Anderson (3:45)
"My Kind of Music" – Ray Scott (3:01)
"You're Like Comin' Home" – Lonestar (4:01)
"Goodbye Time" – Blake Shelton (3:26)
"Hicktown" – Jason Aldean (5:08)
"God's Will" – Martina McBride (5:51)
"If Heaven" – Andy Griggs (3:33)
"It's Getting Better All the Time" – Brooks & Dunn (4:13)

Charts

Weekly charts

Year-end charts

References

Totally Country
2006 compilation albums